The Law and Mr. Jones is an American legal drama series starring James Whitmore. The series aired on ABC in two nonconsecutive seasons from October 7, 1960 to June 2, 1961, and again from April 19 to July 12, 1962. The program was created and produced by Sy Gomberg, and was set in New York City.

Cast

Main
 James Whitmore as Abraham Lincoln Jones
 Janet De Gore as Marsha Spear
 Conlan Carter as C.E. Carruthers

Guest stars
Notable guest stars include:

J. Pat O'Malley, a character actor, in "What's in a Name?"
Frank Silvera as Garcia in "Music to Hurt By"
Parley Baer, noted character actor, in "Drivel"
Beverly Washburn, who starred with Loretta Young and in the 1957 western film Old Yeller, as Sue in "A Question of Guilt"
Barbara Bain, later of Mission: Impossible, as D.J. in "Christmas Is a Legal Holiday"
Nancy Marchand, later the publisher on Lou Grant, as Dorothy in "The Long Echo"
William Fawcett in "The Great Gambling Raid"
Norman Fell, also on 87th Precinct, as Fred Cook in the episode "Lethal Weapons"
Eduard Franz as Gustave Helmer and Jack Mullaney in "The Concert"
Dick Powell as Colonel Drayton in "Everybody Versus Timmy Drayton"
Vic Morrow, later of Combat!, as Dr. Bigelow in "A Very Special Citizen"
Robert Middleton in "Accidental Tourist"
Whit Bissell as Howard Barron and Otto Kruger as Franklyn Malleson Ghentin  in "A Fool for a Client"
Ross Martin, later on The Wild Wild West, as Frank Brody and Harry Dean Stanton as Harry Walker in "The Enemy"
Michael Parks, later of Then Came Bronson, in "One by One"
Roger Mobley, a Disney child actor, as Tommy Pierce in "The Boy Who Said No"
Eve McVeagh, film and television actress and Hitchcock favorite in episode "The Boy Who Said No"
John Larch as Richard Walker in "The Reunion"
Tom Bosley, later of Happy Days, as Assistant District Attorney Ryan in "The Man Who Wanted to Die"
Jack Albertson, who played Grandpa Joe in the film Willy Wonka & the Chocolate Factory, as Karl Hansen in "Accidental Jeopardy"
Brenda Scott as Mary in "My Worthy Colleague"

Production
In 2000, James Whitmore said of the series, "That thing arose out of the American Civil Liberties Union … This was right after the McCarthy thing was so hot in this country, and I thought it was time we did something about the right of people to disagree with one another in a reasonable fashion … That was the predication of that show, and I produced it … It was a wonderful experience." ABC had canceled the series after its first season, but thousands of angry letters from fans convinced them to bring the show back in 1962. Whitmore explained, "We were taken off the air after one year, because I didn't want to do the commercials [for] Gleem Toothpaste. They wanted me as that character, that lawyer, to come on and say, 'You ought to use Gleem toothpaste,' and I didn't think I wanted to do that, so they dropped us. Procter and Gamble were our sponsors. Then, they had an astonishing hundreds of thousands of letters. It was engineered by some newspaper guys to get the show back on, and they brought it back on. I believe, if I'm not mistaken, the only time that had ever happened, with a TV show. I think it's happened since, but not at that point. We were brought back for one year."

Episodes

Season 1 (1960–61)

Season 2 (1962)

References

External links

1960 American television series debuts
1962 American television series endings
American Broadcasting Company original programming
1960s American legal television series
1960s American drama television series
Black-and-white American television shows
English-language television shows
Television series by Four Star Television
Television shows set in New York City
Television series by 20th Century Fox Television
American television series revived after cancellation